Pathanapuram State assembly constituency is one of the 140 state legislative assembly constituencies in Kerala state in southern India. It is also one of the 7 state legislative assembly constituencies included in the Mavelikara Lok Sabha constituency. As of the 2016 assembly elections, the current MLA is K. B. Ganesh Kumar of KC(B).

Local self governed segments
Pathanapuram Niyamasabha constituency is composed of the following local self governed segments:

Members of Legislative Assembly
The following list contains all members of Kerala legislative assembly who have represented Pathanapuram Niyamasabha Constituency during the period of various assemblies:

Key

Election results
Percentage change (±%) denotes the change in the number of votes from the immediate previous election.

Niyamasabha Election 2016
There were 1,89,837 registered voters in Pathanapuram Constituency for the 2016 Kerala Niyamasabha Election.

Niyamasabha Election 2011 
There were 1,72,946 registered voters in the constituency for the 2011 election.

See also
 Pathanapuram
 Kollam district
 List of constituencies of the Kerala Legislative Assembly
 2016 Kerala Legislative Assembly election

References 

Assembly constituencies of Kerala

Assembly constituencies in Kollam district
1957 establishments in Kerala
Constituencies established in 1957